Loiq Sherali (formerly: Kolkhozchiyon) is a jamoat in western Tajikistan. It is part of the city of Panjakent in Sughd Region. The jamoat has a total population of 18,765 (2015). It consists of 7 villages, including Gusar (the seat), Navobod and Zavron.

References

Populated places in Sughd Region
Jamoats of Tajikistan